Porto Murtinho is a municipality located in the Brazilian state of Mato Grosso do Sul. Its population was 17,298 (2020) and its area is 17,735 km².

References

External links 
Pantanal Escapes - Travel Guide and Tourism in Porto Murtinho

Municipalities in Mato Grosso do Sul